Fourteen Pieces: Selected Works 1995 is a music album by techno/trance artist Cosmic Baby, which was released internationally on 27 May 1996. It is Cosmic Baby's third full-length album. It was released as a double CD with seven tracks on each CD ("fourteen pieces" in total). The album is of a slightly more experimental and improvisational nature than its predecessors.

Track listing

References

External links 
 Fourteen Pieces at Discogs
 Fourteen Pieces in unofficial discography
 
 Cosmic Baby homepage

Cosmic Baby albums
1996 albums